Nebanice is a municipality and village in Cheb District in the Karlovy Vary Region of the Czech Republic. It has about 300 inhabitants.

Administrative parts
The village of Hartoušov is an administrative part of Nebanice.

History
The first written mention of Nebanice is from 1391.

References

Villages in Cheb District